The 2015 Eneco Tour was a road cycling stage race that took place in the Netherlands and Belgium between 10 and 16 August 2015. It was the 11th edition of the Eneco Tour stage race and was the twenty-first race of the 2015 UCI World Tour.

The Eneco Tour is an unusual race in the cycling season: it primarily favours classics riders rather than climbers. The first three stages of the race were suitable for sprinters; the fourth stage was an individual time trial; and the final three stages were suitable for the classics riders. Elia Viviani won the first stage and was the first rider to wear the leader's jersey. Jesper Asselman took over the lead after the second stage due to time bonuses, before losing it in the time trial to Jos van Emden. Wilco Kelderman (also ) took the lead after the fifth stage, but lost it to Tim Wellens the following day. Wellens defended his lead on the final stage to win his second successive Eneco Tour; he had been the defending champion after victory in 2014. Greg Van Avermaet was second, with Kelderman third.

The points classification was won by André Greipel and the combativity award by Gijs Van Hoecke.  also won the team classification.

Teams 

The 17 UCI World Tour teams were automatically entitled and obliged to start the race; three UCI Professional Continental teams were invited as wildcards to form a twenty-team peloton. Each team entered eight riders to form a 160-rider peloton; one rider, 's Daniel Oss, withdrew before the race due to a fall in training, so 159 riders started the race.

Schedule 

The first three stages of the race were flat road stages, with no classified climbs. All of these stages were expected to suit the sprinters, though crosswinds had the potential to make the stages more difficult. The decisive section of the race was expect to start with the individual time trial on stage 4. The final three stages of the race were expected to suit classics riders: the fifth and sixth stages were hilly stages in the style of the Ardennes classics, while the final stage used roads that feature in the cobbled classics. One change to the regulations in 2015 was the introduction of a "golden kilometre", a series of three intermediate sprints on each road stage approximately  before the finish. The first three riders across each of these sprint points won bonus seconds in the general classification. This replicated the system from the 2015 Tour of Belgium, where the golden kilometre system had played a part in the victory of Greg Van Avermaet.

Pre-race favourites 

Most World Tour stage races are won by strong climbers. The Eneco Tour is unusual because the favourites for overall victory were classics riders—those who perform strongly in the Ardennes classics and the cobbled classics that feature in the early part of the cycling season.

The defending champion was Tim Wellens, who won the 2014 Eneco Tour in the penultimate stage. He was one of the favourites again, although Cycling Weekly predicted that he would be given less freedom to attack as the defending champion. One other former winner of the race took part in 2015: Lars Boom had won in 2012. He was another strong favourite in 2015, especially as the race included a longer time trial than other recent editions of the race. Other favourites included Niki Terpstra, who was third in 2012, Greg Van Avermaet, who was in strong form after coming close to victory in the Clásica de San Sebastián, Philippe Gilbert (also BMC) and Wilco Kelderman.

The first three stages of the race were flat and therefore particularly suitable for sprinters. Prominent sprinters taking part in the race included André Greipel, Giacomo Nizzolo, Elia Viviani, Andrea Guardini and Edward Theuns.

Stages

Stage 1 

10 August 2015 – Bolsward to Bolsward, 

The first stage was a  flat stage in the Netherlands, starting and finishing in Bolsward. The race began with a large loop south of the town, through Sneek and then north along the coast from Oudemirdum, then returning to Bolsward. After the first time across the finish line, the race turned north for a shorter loop, through Franeker and then south along the coast from Harlingen, before returning to Bolsward for the second time across the finish line. There were then two laps of a  finishing circuit. The stage contained no climbs.

The day's early breakaway was formed by Nathan Haas, Frederik Veuchelen, Laurens De Vreese, Jesper Asselman, Nico Denz, and David Boucher. The racing conditions were fairly easy, as there were no crosswinds. The breakaway's lead was over seven minutes at one point, but this was quickly closed down by the peloton and reduced to three minutes with  remaining. Sky's Andy Fenn was leading out his teammate Elia Viviani and, with  remaining, Viviani was able to follow the wheel of André Greipel. Greipel opened his sprint with a long distance to the finish line and Viviani was able to follow him and then come past him to take the stage victory. Danny van Poppel finished second and Jean-Pierre Drucker third, with Greipel in fourth place.

Stage 2 

11 August 2015 – Breda to Breda, 

The second stage of the race started in the south of the Netherlands, starting and finishing in Breda. The stage began with a loop to the south of Breda, around Ulvenhout, then crossed the finish line to begin a much larger loop. This second loop took the riders north to Wagenberg, then south-west to Bosschenhoofd and south-east to Meer, where the Tour entered Belgium for the first time. Here the route turned north again, passing to the east of Ulvenhout and returning to cross the finish line for the second time. The final part of the stage was two laps of a finishing circuit to the east of Breda; these laps included the golden kilometre.

The early breakaway was formed by two riders, Gijs Van Hoecke and, for the second day running, Jesper Asselman. Asselman allowed Van Hoecke to win the two early sprints for the combativity jersey and, in return, was allowed to win all three sprints in the golden kilometre. The two riders had a two-minute advantage at this point. In the main peloton, Philippe Gilbert and Andriy Hryvko competed for the remaining one-second bonuses: Gilbert won the first and third; Hryvko won the second. Asselman and Van Hoecke were then caught by the peloton—led by —with  remaining. He finished comfortably ahead of Guarnieri, with Boonen in third.

Asselman finished in 78th place on the stage, in the same time as Greipel. As a result of the bonus seconds won in the golden kilometre, he moved into the overall lead of the race. Greipel was in second place, five seconds behind and on the same time as Elia Viviani. This was the first time that any rider from  had worn a leader's jersey in a UCI race.

Stage 3 

12 August 2015 – Beveren to Ardooie, 

The third stage of the race took place entirely in Belgium. It was a  course that contained no classified climbs; it was the final flat stage of the race. The route began in Beveren with a circuit around the municipality. The course then took the riders west as far as Bassevelde, before turning south-west towards Ardooie. After the riders crossed the finish line for the first time, they began two laps of a finishing circuit around the town; these included the golden kilometre.

The breakaway was formed by three riders early in the race. These were David Boucher, Edward Theuns and Frederik Veuchelen. They built a lead that reached four minutes, but were always under control by the peloton.  did a lot of the work at the front of the peloton controlling the breakaway. With  remaining, Gorka Izagirre and Hugo Houle touched wheels and crashed after a sharp corner. Houle continued, but Izagirre was forced to abandon the race and was taken to hospital in an ambulance following a blow to his head on a traffic signal. Theuns won all three of the golden kilometre sprints; the nine bonus seconds moved him up to fifth place overall at the end of the stage. The breakaway was caught with  remaining and, apart from a brief attack from Nathan Haas, the peloton came to the finish together.

The peloton split slightly due to 's work. Arnaud Démare was the first to start sprinting. Tom Boonen, however, was able to follow him, despite clashing wheels at one point, and came past in the final metres to take the stage victory. Démare was second with Viviani third. Boonen moved up into second place overall following the stage, one second behind Asselman and on the same time as Viviani.

After the stage, Boucher was thrown out of the race by his team. He had recently been told that his contract would not be renewed and had disobeyed team orders not to go in the day's breakaway.

Stage 4 

13 August 2015 – Hoogerheide to Hoogerheide,  (ITT)

Stage 4 was a  individual time trial around Hoogerheide in the Netherlands. The course was fairly flat, with a slight downhill section towards the start and a gentle uphill section towards the finish, the Rijzendeweg.

Soon afterwards, however, that time was beaten by Jos van Emden. The only other rider to come close to Van Emden's time was his teammate Wilco Kelderman, who finished the course five seconds behind to take second place. Van Emden also moved into the overall lead of the race.

Several other contenders for overall victory finished the course in good times. These included BMC's Greg Van Avermaet and Philippe Gilbert and Astana's Lars Boom. 's riders were less successful, however. Their best-placed rider was Julian Alaphillippe, 41 seconds behind Van Emden. Niki Terpstra, who had been considered a favourite for the overall victory, suffered mechanical problems, changed bikes twice and finished 1' 26" back.

Stage 5 

14 August 2015 – Riemst to Sittard-Geleen, 

The fifth stage of the race was the first hilly stage, with 23 categorised climbs. Many of these climbs (known as hellingen) feature in the Amstel Gold Race. It began in Riemst in the Belgian province of Limburg. The riders completed one and a half laps of a circuit of the town; this included the first climb of the day, the Muizenberg. The course then left the town to the east, crossing the Halembaye, before crossing the border into the Dutch province of Limburg. As the route continued to the east, the riders climbed the Heiweg, the Bergenhuizen, the Camerig and the Schuttebergsweg. The route then turned to the north, though it frequently turned back on itself to take in the various climbs. These included the Mamelisserweg, the Gulperbergweg, the Eyserbosweg, the Hulsberg, the Schanternelsweg, the Fromberg and the Sweikhuizerberg. After this, the route entered two and a half laps of a finishing circuit around Sittard-Geleen. On the two complete laps, the riders climbed the Windraak, the Kollenberg, the Sittarderweg and the Weg langs Stammen. The golden kilometre came on the first lap between the last two of these climbs. After the two complete laps, the riders climbed the Windraak once more, before finishing in Sittard-Geleen.

The breakaway was formed after  by Dylan van Baarle and Johan Le Bon. Van Baarle and Le Bon had a lead of five minutes at one point; this was reduced to three and a half minutes with  remaining. The breakaway riders did not contest the bonus seconds in the golden kilometre, though Van Avermaet and Gilbert took the remaining seconds in the main peloton. A heavy thunderstorm started as the riders entered the finishing circuit and disrupted the chasing group, with no team taking responsibility for the chase; Le Bon and van Baarle had a lead of over two minutes as they entered the final lap. Lars Petter Nordhaug and Lars Boom both put in brief attacks but soon sat up. The lead was reduced to just over a minute with  remaining; at this point, as the riders crossed the Weg langs Stammen, André Greipel put in an attack and was joined by Wellens, Kelderman, 's Georg Preidler and 's Magnus Cort to form a chase group.

The five-man chase group did not work well together, with only Greipel and Wellens consistently working at the front of the group. Kelderman put in a brief surge on the final climb of the Windraak to reduce van Baarle and Le Bon's lead, but the group was not able to bring the leading pair back. Van Baarle and Le Bon worked together until the final , when Le Bon attacked in the slipstream of one of the motorbikes following the race. Van Baarle continued chasing but, with both riders exhausted from their efforts through the day, he was unable properly to regain contact. Le Bon was able to hold on in the sprint to take the stage victory, with Van Baarle finishing second on the same time. Cort won the sprint for third, with Wellens and Kelderman on the same time. Kelderman took over the race lead, one second ahead of Le Bon, with Van Emden dropping to fourth.

Stage 6 

15 August 2015 – Heerlen to Houffalize, 

The race started in the Netherlands, in Heerlen, with a circuit that included the climb of the Bergseweg. The route left the town to the south, crossing the Mamelisserweg and the Schuttebergsweg before entering Belgium. The route continued to the south as it entered the Ardennes. The riders climbed the Col de Spitzberg, the Côte la Firme Libert and the Côte de Wanneranval on the way to the finishing town of Houffalize. The route loops around to the south of the town before entering two laps of a finishing circuit. The circuit crossed the Côte Saint-Roch again, then the Rue Bois des Moines, the Côte d'Achouffe and the Côte Petite Mormont, before finishing in Houffalize. The significant difference from previous year's editions of the Eneco Tour was the absence of La Redoute from the finish.

The day's early breakaway was formed by Jan Polanc, Matthias Brändle, Nikias Arndt, Sébastien Turgot and Jérôme Baugnies. Though they had a four-minute lead at one stage, they were caught as the race entered the finishing circuit. Andrey Amador was the first to attack from the peloton, with numerous other attacks following, and a new, eight-man leading group was formed. This did not initially include Kelderman, the race leader, but he was able to rejoin the lead group as it grew to nineteen riders. Brändle attacked again and briefly led the race, but he was caught by work from Van Avermaet. Simon Geschke attacked and was joined by Michael Rogers. Wellens soon attacked from the group behind; he caught and passed Geschke and Rogers on the Côte Saint-Roch, then won nine seconds in the sprints in the golden kilometre. Van Avermaet attacked from the main group; he too passed Geschke and Rogers to take second place in all three sprints and win six seconds.

Kelderman was once again dropped from the main group and was then again able to rejoin it, but the group was not able to chase Wellens down. Geschke and Van Avermaet rode together, while Jan Bakelants and Tom-Jelte Slagter attacked from the main group. Wellens's lead extended during the downhill run into Houffalize; he won the stage by 49 seconds ahead of Van Avermaet, with Geschke third. Wellens moved into the overall lead, 1' 03" ahead of Van Avermaet, with Kelderman dropping to third.

Stage 7 

16 August 2015 – Sint-Pieters-Leeuw to Geraardsbergen, 

The final stage of the race took place entirely in Belgium. It was a  route that started in Sint-Pieters-Leeuw on the outskirts of Brussels and ended in Geraardsbergen in the area of East Flanders known as the Flemish Ardennes. The principal feature of stage 6 was the series of cobbled climbs. The stage began with a circuit in Sint-Pieters-Leeuw, then headed west. The first climb was the Pelikaanberg, but this was the only climb in the first  of racing. The final  included 16 climbs. The first of these, the Mont, came as the route turned north towards Oudenaarde and was followed by the Kanarieberg and the Edelareberg. Here the riders turned to the east and crossed a series of climbs also used in the Tour of Flanders: the Leberg, the Berendries and the Valkenberg. The riders then crossed the Tenbosse before entering the two and a half laps of the finishing circuit. This included four climbs: the Denderoordberg, the Muur van Geraardsbergen (the final climb in the Tour of Flanders until 2012), the Bosberg and the Okerzelerstraat. After two complete laps, the route finished halfway up the Muur van Geraardsbergen.

There was a fourteen-rider breakaway that formed at the beginning of the day's racing. This group never had a large advantage and broke up on the first ascent of the Muur. The lead group after the climb was formed of three men: Manuel Quinziato, Björn Leukemans and Yves Lampaert. Attacks came from the main group and eventually a ten-man chasing group was formed.

Quinziato, the weakest climber of the three leading riders, attacked at the summit of the Denderoordberg, the penultimate climb of the day, quickly dropping Lampaert. Leukemans attempted to hold Quinziato's wheel, but was dropped on the flat. Quinziato soon had half a minute's lead and entered the base of the Muur alone. He had more difficulty on the climb, however: as Leukemans and Lampaert reached the cobbles, they quickly began to catch him. Quinziato eventually crossed the line with just a few seconds to spare. This was the second professional victory of his career, nine years after his first, which had come in the 2006 Eneco Tour. Wellens finished in a large group 42 seconds back and sealed his overall victory in the race.

Classification leadership table 

There were four principal classifications in the race. The first of these was the general classification, calculated by adding up the time each rider took to ride each stage. Time bonuses were applied for winning stages (10, 6 and 4 seconds to the first three riders) and for the three "golden kilometre" sprints on each stage. At each of these sprints, the first three riders were given 3-, 2- and 1-second bonuses respectively. The rider with the lowest cumulative time was the winner of the general classification. The rider leading the classification won a white jersey.

There was also a points classification. On each road stage the riders were awarded points for finishing in the top 10 places, with other points awarded for intermediate sprints. The rider with the most accumulated points was the leader of the classification and won the red jersey. The combativity classification was based solely on points won at the intermediate sprints; the leading rider won the green jersey. The final stage was a team classification: on each stage the times of the best three riders on each team were added up. The team with the lowest cumulative time over the seven stages won the team classification.

References

External links 
 

Benelux Tour
Eneco Tour
Eneco Tour
Eneco Tour